Mariniphaga anaerophila is a Gram-negative, facultatively aerobic, non-spore-forming, rod-shaped, mesophilic, chemoheterotrophic and non-motile bacterium from the genus of Mariniphaga which has been isolated from tidal flat sediments from the Tokyo Bay in Japan.

References

Bacteroidia
Bacteria described in 2014